was a village located in Nishimorokata District, Miyazaki Prefecture, Japan.

As of 2003, the village had an estimated population of 2,364 and the density of 9.71 persons per km². The total area was 243.47 km².

On March 20, 2006, Suki was merged into the expanded city of Kobayashi and no longer exists as an independent municipality.

External links
Official website of Kobayashi  (English version)

Dissolved municipalities of Miyazaki Prefecture